Sandsfjorden or Sandsfjord is a fjord in Suldal Municipality in Rogaland county, Norway. The fjord begins at the confluence of the Saudafjorden and Hylsfjorden, just north of the village of Sand. It then travels to the southwest until it reaches the island of Foldøy, where the fjord joins the main Boknafjorden. The villages of Jelsa and Hebnes are located on either side of the mouth of the fjord.

The Sandsfjord Bridge crosses the fjord near the village of Marvik. The bridge opened in the fall of 2015 and it connects the Norwegian National Road 13 to the Norwegian County Road 46. It replaced a ferry route across the fjord from Ropeid to Sand.

See also
 List of Norwegian fjords

References

Fjords of Rogaland
Suldal